Justice Mandagadde Rama Jois (27 July 1931 – 16 February 2021) was an Indian politician and judge who served as a member of Rajya Sabha, as governor of Jharkhand and Bihar states, and as Chief Justice of the Punjab and Haryana High Court. He was also a senior advocate in the Supreme Court of India.

Early life and education
Rama Jois was Brahmin born to Narasimha Jois and Lakshmidevamma on 27 July 1931 at Araga village, Shivamogga, Karnataka, India. He studied in  Shivamogga and Bengaluru and acquired B.A., B.L.degrees and Kuvempu University has conferred him with Doctor of Laws honorary degree.

Author
He is a noted writer and historian having written  several  books on Service Law, Habeas Corpus Law, Constitutional Law, etc. His most known two-volume book "Legal and Constitutional History of India", considered as a previous volume,  is a textbook for Law Degree course. His other well known book is "Seeds of Modern Public Law in Ancient Indian Jurisprudence". His other works include "Historic Legal Battle", " Dharma - The Global Ethic" etc. His views on Dharma and Manu Smriti are of immense value, as they have been simplified for the understanding of the common man.

Other Books published

Services under the State (1974)
Legal and Constitutional History of India (1982)
Historical Battle (1977)
Dharma : The Global Ethic (English, Hindi and Kannada) (1996)
Ancient Indian Law : Eternal values in Manu Smrithi (English, Kannada, Hindi) (2003)
Trivarga Siddantha (English and Kannada) (2005)
The Bharathiya way to lead Purposeful life (English and Kannada) 2007
National Reconciliation for Harmonious Living (2008)
Code of Conduct for Rulers (English and Kannada) 2007
Raja Dharma with lessons on Raja neethi
Need for Amending the Constitution

Positions held
Governor of Jharkhand State
Governor of Bihar State
Rajya Sabha Member in Karnataka
Chief Justice, Punjab and Haryana High Court

Political affiliation
During The Emergency (India) 1975-77, imposed by Indira Gandhi, he was imprisoned and lodged in the Bengaluru Central Jail. He was lodged along with A B Vajapayee, L K Advani, Madhu Dandavate etc. in Bengaluru prison. He is recognised with Bharatiya Janata Party in Karnataka.

Protest
He relinquished the post of Judge of the Karnataka High Court, protesting injustice, as he was overlooked to be posted as a Supreme Court Judge.

Family life
He was married to Smt. Vimala, has two children and three grandchildren. He resided in Bengaluru, India. His son M. R. Shailendra and daughter M. R. Tara are both advocates in the city of Bengaluru, India.

Death 
Rama Jois died from a heart attack on 16 February 2021 at 7:30 AM in his residence at Rajajinagar, Bengaluru, India.

His last rites were held at Hindu burial-ground in Chamarajpet, Bengaluru, India.

References

External links
 Mandagadde Rama Jois, Governor of Jharkhand
 Official Website

Judges of the Karnataka High Court
Writers from Karnataka
Indian legal writers
Governors of Jharkhand
Governors of Bihar
Rajya Sabha members from Karnataka
People from Shimoga district
2021 deaths
20th-century Indian historians
1932 births
Chief Justices of the Punjab and Haryana High Court
20th-century Indian judges
Bharatiya Janata Party politicians from Karnataka
Rajya Sabha members from the Bharatiya Janata Party